Sergey Nikolaevich Kostiuchenko (Russian:Сергей Николаевич Костюченко) is a Belarusian military conductor. He is the former Chief Director of the Military Band Service of the Armed Forces of the Republic of Belarus, holding this post from 2008-2019. At 11 in the band service was the second longest serving director of the bands after Alexander Fedorov who served for 14 years.

Early life and career 
He was born on December 17, 1965. At the age of six he began to learn to play the accordion and wind instruments. In 1981, Kostiuchenko was enrolled in the Moscow Military Music College. After graduating with honors in 1985, he entered the Tchaikovsky Moscow State Conservatory. In 1990, he was appointed the chief conductor for the massed bands of the Belarusian Military District. Between 1990 and 2008, he served as military conductor of the Band of the 103rd Guards Airborne Division. He later would serve as chief conductor for the Band of the Minsk Higher Engineering Air Defense Missile School and the Honor Guard of the Armed Forces. At the same time, he simultaneously served as the deputy chief of the military band service under V. Ermolaev. Since 2008, he has served as the Director of the Military Band Service of the Armed Forces and the exemplary central band. During his tenure as chief director, he put the Central band of the armed forces in many military festivals, such as Moscow's Spasskaya Tower Military Music Festival and Tattoo. He retired in the summer of 2019, with his last public duty being the director of the bands of the Minsk Garrison during the Minsk Independence Day Parade in 2019, which celebrated the 75th anniversary of the Minsk Offensive. He was succeeded by Lieutenant Colonel Igor Khlebus.

See also 
 Central Band of the Armed Forces of the Republic of Belarus

References 

1965 births
Living people
Belarusian composers
Belarusian military personnel
Moscow Conservatory alumni
Moscow Military Music College alumni
Military musicians